Santa Ana is a department of El Salvador in the northwest of the country. The capital is Santa Ana, one of the largest cities in El Salvador. It has 2,023 km² and a population of over 613,000. The Santa Ana Volcano is located in this department.

History

Geography

Municipalities 
Santa Ana is divided into 13 municipalities:

References
 Directorio Municipal de la Fundación Dr. Guillermo Manuel Ungo
 El Salvador at GeoHive

 
Departments of El Salvador
States and territories established in 1855
1855 establishments in El Salvador